Georgios Anitsas (born 1891, date of death unknown) was a Greek sports shooter. He competed in the team free rifle event at the 1924 Summer Olympics.

References

External links
 

1891 births
Year of death missing
Greek male sport shooters
Olympic shooters of Greece
Shooters at the 1924 Summer Olympics
Sportspeople from Volos
20th-century Greek people